Üzümlü   is a village in Erdemli district of Mersin Province, Turkey, at . It is situated in the valley of Müğlü creek in the Toros Mountains. It is surrounded by pine forests and vineyards. The population of Üzümlü was 229 as of 2019, down from 308 in 2000.

The village was founded 200 years ago by Yörüks (once nomadic Turkmens) from Alanya. Later another clan from Malatya also settled in Üzümlü. It was a neighbourhood of Şahna called Küçük Şahna ("Little Şahna") until sundered and declared a separate village. Farming is the major activity of the village. As implied by the name of the village (Üzüm means "grape") the main crop of the village is grapes. Citrus is also produced.

References

Villages in Erdemli District